Ernest A. Douglas was a British actor of the silent era.

Selected filmography
 Rock of Ages (1918)
 Linked by Fate (1919)
 Darby and Joan (1920)
 The Call of the Road (1920)
 Ernest Maltravers (1920)
 Dangerous Lies (1921)
 The Persistent Lovers (1922)
 Out to Win (1923)
 The Loves of Mary, Queen of Scots (1923)
 Hurricane Hutch in Many Adventures (1924)

References

External links

Year of birth unknown
Year of death unknown
British male silent film actors
20th-century British male actors